Grand Island, Nebraska is a center of media in south-central Nebraska.  The following is a list of media outlets in the city.

Print

Newspapers
The Grand Island Independent is the city's primary newspaper, published daily. Other newspapers published in Grand Island include:
 Buenos Dias Nebraska, Spanish language paper, twice monthly
 West Nebraska Register, published by the Roman Catholic Diocese of Grand Island, twice monthly

Radio
In its fall 2013 ranking of radio markets by population, Arbitron ranked the Grand Island-Kearney-Hastings market 251st in the United States.

The following is a list of radio stations licensed to and/or broadcasting from Grand Island:

AM

FM

Television
Grand Island lies within the Lincoln-Hastings-Kearney television market.

The following is a list of television stations that broadcast from and/or are licensed to the city.

References

Mass media in Nebraska